Erkam Reşmen (born 29 November 1989) is a Turkish football player who plays as right-back for Ankara Keçiörengücü. He plays mostly as a right-back, and occasionally as a centerback.

Reşmen represented the Turkey national under-19 football team in a 4-3 friendly loss to Sweden U19 in 2007.

References

External links

1989 births
Living people
People from Antalya
Turkish footballers
Turkey youth international footballers
Antalyaspor footballers
Beşiktaş J.K. footballers
Gaziantep F.K. footballers
Boluspor footballers
Çorumspor footballers
Kayserispor footballers
1922 Konyaspor footballers
Samsunspor footballers
Ankara Keçiörengücü S.K. footballers
Süper Lig players
TFF Second League players
Association football defenders